The Basilica of San Prudencio de Armentia is a basilica located in Armentia, Vitoria-Gasteiz, Basque Country, Spain. It was built in the 12th-century in Romanesque style. It was declared Bien de Interés Cultural in 1931.

References

External links
 

12th-century Roman Catholic church buildings in Spain
Bien de Interés Cultural landmarks in Álava
Buildings and structures in Vitoria-Gasteiz
Churches in Álava
Romanesque architecture in the Basque Country (autonomous community)